Otto is an unincorporated community in Bethlehem Township, Clark County, Indiana.

History
A post office was established at Otto in 1864, and remained in operation until it was discontinued in 1950. The community was named for a judge.

Geography

References

Unincorporated communities in Clark County, Indiana
Unincorporated communities in Indiana
Louisville metropolitan area